Henrique Duarte Haddad (born 28 May 1987 in Rio de Janeiro) is a Brazilian sailor. He and Bruno Bethlem placed 23rd in the men's 470 event at the 2016 Summer Olympics.

In 2019 he won the Snipe World Championship.

He represented Brazil at the 2020 Summer Olympics.

References

External links

1987 births
Living people
Brazilian male sailors (sport)
Olympic sailors of Brazil
Sailors at the 2016 Summer Olympics – 470
Sailors at the 2020 Summer Olympics – 470
Snipe class world champions
Sportspeople from Rio de Janeiro (city)